Joaquín Novoa Méndez (born 25 August 1983) is a Spanish cyclist.

Palmarès
2006
1st Rutas del Vino
1st stages 1 and 2
2007
2nd Memorial Valenciaga

References

1983 births
Living people
Spanish male cyclists
People from Ávila, Spain
Sportspeople from the Province of Ávila
Cyclists from Castile and León